Kota Iskandar (Jawi: كوتا إسكندر) (formerly Johor State New Administrative Centre (JSNAC)) is the administrative centre of the state of Johor, Malaysia and its seat of government (Executive branch & Legislative branch of the Johor state government). It is located in Iskandar Puteri, Johor Bahru District and it is the first phase of the Iskandar Puteri project. The Iskandar Puteri project itself is a part of Iskandar Malaysia. Kota Iskandar was developed by Cahaya Jauhar and the first phase was completed in 2008.

Name
Kota Iskandar was named after the late Sultan of Johor, Almarhum Sultan Iskandar.

History
On 24 February 2004, the Johor State Government approved to build a new state administrative centre in Nusajaya, and the seat of government will also migrate to Nusajaya with allocation of 129.5 ha (320 arces) of waterfront site in the 9,700 ha (24,000 arces) Nusajaya site. Originally, the first choice to build the new administrative centre is in Johor Lama, and will named it as "Johor Perdana". But due to 1997 Asian Economic Crisis, the initial concept plan was cancelled and the state government suffered a setback and many companies collapsed at that time. In 2000, Renong (UEM Land) approached to the state government to allocate a site for free in Nusajata to build the new administrative centre and develop the place jointly with state government. UEM Land also offered to buy the government 20% stake in Prolink Development Sdn Bhd (currently known as Bandar Nusajaya Development Sdn Bhd) that formed to develop Nusajaya, the share purchase would provide the government with the funds to build the place. 

Kota Iskandar was officially launched by Sultan Iskandar on 19 April 2009. Within the same month, 2,200 civil servants moved to the new complex and the first sitting for Johor legislative assembly happened on 19 June 2009. In February 2010, public transportation was introduced to the area.

Architecture
The administrative centre consists of the State Assembly Building, Chief Minister's and State Secretariat's Office (Dato' Jaafar Muhammad Building). The buildings are based on a Johor-Malay and Moorish architecture. The Chief Minister's and State Secretary Office houses the chief minister's office, state EXCO offices, Secretary of State office and many other departments. It has  of office space in a five-storey structure.

Component
 Kota Iskandar Mosque
  Sultan Ismail Building (Johor State Parliament)
 Dataran Mahkota
 Dato' Jaafar Muhammad Building(Chief Minister's and State Secretariat's Office)
 Dato' Muhamad Salleh Perang Building (State Department Office)
 Bangunan Dato' Muhamad Ibrahim Munsyi (State Department Office)
 Bangunan Dato' Abdul Rahman Andak (State Department Office)

Recognition & Awards
 2012 Malaysia Landscape Architecture Award 2012 - Merit Award, Cluster C2S Complex Kota Iskandar
 2012 Johor Tourism Awards - Anugerah Khas
 2012 Johor Tourism Awards - Best Tourism Website
 2012 Singapore Design Awards - Destination Branding - Silver
 2011 Malaysia Landscape Architecture Award - Excellent Landscape Planning and Development Honour Award
 2011 FIABCI Prix d'Excellence Award - Public Infrastructure / Amenities Runner-Up Paphos, Cyprus
 2010 FIABCI Malaysia Property Award - Public Sector Winner
 2009 A Johor State Tourism Top 10 Attraction
 2007 Malaysian Institute of Planners (MIP) Planning Excellence Award - Planning Innovation Winner

Roads
Lebuh Kota Iskandar
Persiaran Dato' Bentara Luar
Persiaran Dewan Negeri
Persiaran Tun Sri Lanang
Persiaran Dato' Menteri
Persiaran Dato' Sri Amar Diraja
Persiaran Laksamana
Lebuh Bahtera

See also
 Iskandar Puteri
 Cahaya Jauhar
 UEM Land
 List of Menteris Besar of Johor

References
Kota Iskandar - Johor's Living Legacy

External links

 Tourism Malaysia - Kota Iskandar Johor

2008 establishments in Malaysia
Iskandar Puteri
Populated places in Johor